The 2010 FIFA World Cup qualification UEFA Group 8 was a UEFA qualifying group for the 2010 FIFA World Cup. The group comprised 2006 FIFA World Cup winner Italy, Bulgaria, Republic of Ireland, Cyprus, Georgia and Montenegro.

The group was won by Italy, who qualified for the 2010 FIFA World Cup. The runners-up the Republic of Ireland entered the UEFA play-off stage.

Standings

Matches
The representatives of the six federations met in Sofia, Bulgaria on 15 January 2008 to decide on a fixture calendar.

Notes

Goalscorers
There were 77 goals scored during the 30 games, an average 2.56 goals per game.

5 goals
 Dimitar Berbatov
 Robbie Keane

4 goals
 Michalis Konstantinou
 Alberto Gilardino

3 goals
 Levan Kobiashvili
 Mirko Vučinić

2 goals

 Dimitar Telkiyski
 Martin Petrov
 Efstathios Aloneftis
 Constantinos Charalambides
 Chrysis Michael
 Ioannis Okkas
 Vladimir Dvalishvili
 Richard Dunne
 Kevin Doyle
 Glenn Whelan
 Alberto Aquilani
 Daniele De Rossi
 Antonio Di Natale
 Vincenzo Iaquinta
 Dejan Damjanović
 Stevan Jovetić

1 goal

 Stanislav Angelov
 Valeri Domovchiyski
 Blagoy Georgiev
 Radostin Kishishev
 Dimitar Ivanov Makriev
 Stiliyan Petrov
 Ivelin Popov
 Demetris Christofi
 Marios Elia
 Alexander Iashvili
 Levan Kenia
 Mauro Camoranesi
 Fabio Grosso
 Giampaolo Pazzini
 Andrea Pirlo
 Seán St Ledger
 Radoslav Batak
 Andrija Delibašić

1 own goal
 Kevin Kilbane (playing against Bulgaria)

2 own goals
 Kakha Kaladze (playing against Italy)

Attendances

References

8
2008 in Republic of Ireland association football
2009 in Republic of Ireland association football
2008–09 in Italian football
Qual
2008–09 in Bulgarian football
2009–10 in Bulgarian football
2008–09 in Georgian football
2009–10 in Georgian football
2008–09 in Montenegrin football
2009–10 in Montenegrin football
2008–09 in Cypriot football
2009–10 in Cypriot football